The Carl R. Woese Institute for Genomic Biology (IGB) is an interdisciplinary facility for genomics research at the University of Illinois at Urbana-Champaign. The Institute was built in 2006 to centralize biotechnology research at the University of Illinois. Current research at the IGB explores the genomic bases of a wide range of phenomena, including the progression of cancer, the ecological impact of global change, tissue and organ growth, and the diversity of animal behavior.

History

Construction
Plans for what would become the Carl R. Woese Institute for Genomic Biology (IGB) were formed in the late 1990s.  In 2000, $67.5 million was appropriated by the state of Illinois for its construction. Due to economic hardships, the state halted plans for construction in 2001. In 2002, funds were re-appropriated. Construction began in April 2004 and was completed in November 2006.  The building was dedicated in March 2007. Initially named the Institute for Genomic Biology, it officially changed its name to the Carl R. Woese Institute for Genomic Biology in 2015 to honor the scientific contributions of Carl R. Woese.

Leadership
The IGB was initially led by Harris Lewin, then a professor in the Department of Animal Sciences at the University of Illinois.  Lewin served as the founding director until 2011, when he accepted the position of Research Vice Chancellor at University of California, Davis. Gene E. Robinson, a professor in the Entomology department, took over as Interim Director, and was named the new Director of IGB in January 2012.

Research
The IGB houses approximately 130 faculty and 600 graduate students, postdoctoral fellows, and research personnel. Research is organized into themes, they are reviewed every five years; new themes may be added or existing themes modified to reflect the current state of genomics research.  Current themes are listed below:

Notable awards and partnerships

In 2007, the University of Illinois, along with the University of California, formed a partnership with the energy company BP as part of a major research project to develop bioenergy sources.  The University of Illinois facility is based in the IGB.

In 2011, Abbott Nutrition and the University of Illinois collaborated to establish a research center for the study of the relationship between nutrition and cognition, entitled the Center for Nutrition, Learning, and Memory (CNLM).  Several campus units are currently partners of CNLM, including the IGB.

Building

The IGB is located on the south side of the University of Illinois main campus at Urbana-Champaign.  The building was constructed by the architecture firm CUH2A (now a part of the architecture-engineering company HDR).  The exterior of the building was designed to include elements of Georgian architecture. Inside, each Research Theme has a large, open plan laboratory space and additional work rooms and office and meeting area.  The building stands adjacent to the Morrow Plots.

See also

Beckman Institute for Advanced Science and Technology
Carl Woese
Coordinated Science Laboratory
Gene E. Robinson
University of Illinois at Urbana-Champaign
Lawrence B. Schook

Notes

References

External links

University and college laboratories in the United States
Buildings and structures of the University of Illinois Urbana-Champaign
Research institutes established in 2000
Genomics organizations
Biological research institutes in the United States
Carl Woese